Jonathan Immanuel Kievit (born 14 November 1998), known professionally as Imanu (stylized as IMANU), formerly as Signal is a French-born Dutch DJ, record producer and musician.

Career 
After being exposed to trance and progressive house by a friend at the age of 10, Kievit started producing house at the age of 14. A few years later he discovered the music by Dutch trio Noisia and subsequently started producing drum and bass. Eventually, Dutch drum and bass artist Fre4knc also sent a song by Kievit to Noisia, who then signed him under the alias Signal to their label Invisible Recordings when Kievit was only 16 years old. In 2018 Kievit co-founded the record label Dividid (stylized as DIVIDID) with Mark McCann, better known as Abis and Rotterdam-based promoter Lars Dingeman.

In 2019 Kievit started a new project under the alias "Imanu", which has since been active. As Imanu he pushed the boundaries of drum and bass as a genre and explored other genres, such as house, techno and footwork. He described his style of music as "future breaks" and cited Flume as his primary influence besides Sophie, Cashmere Cat and Arca. 

Since starting with Imanu, Kievit has released music on significant electronic music labels such as Zeds Dead's Deadbeats, Noisia's Vision Recordings, and UKF Music and has collaborated with Noisia, What So Not, Kuc̆ka, Josh Pan and Pham. 

In 2021, Beatport named Kievit as one of six Beatport NEXT artists, supporting him for a full year by offering store featurings, playisting, editorial features, live-streams and social media support.

Debut album 
In June 2022, Kievit announced his debut album 'UNFOLD', which was released on September 16th, 2022 on Deadbeats.

Discography

as Signal 

 2016: Parallax EP (Critical Music)
 2017: Mantura EP (featuring Disprove, Invisible Recordings)
 2018: The Wall EP (featuring Abis, Dividid)
 2018: Doom Desire EP (Shogun Audio)
 2018: Solitude EP (Invisible Recordings)
 2018: Torment/2ME EP (Dividid)

as IMANU 

 2019: EGO EP (Vision)
 2020: Transit (with Mefjus, Vision)
 2020: Technoid (with Halogenix, Critical Music)
 2020: Memento EP (Vision)
 2020: Re:IMANU (Vision)
 2020: Cheren EP (Vision)
 2020: Love That Never (Imanu remix) (Young Art Records) 
 2020: Preamble (with Icicle, Vision) 
 2020: Re: IMANU (Vision) 
 2021: I'm Fine (IMANU remix) (Kannibalen Records)
 2021: A Taste of Hope (UKF)
 2021: Glass Hearts (with Sleepnet, Vision) 
 2021: Skin to Skin (Heaven Sent)
 2021: A Taste Of Hope (Hallowvale) (UKF)
 2021: Buried (with Hypression, Deadbeats)
 2021: Gaspin 4 Air (with Leotrix and The Caracal Project, UKF Music)
 2021: Incessant (IMANU remix) (Vision)
 2022: Neiges / La Fournaise (with The Caracal Project, featuring Josh Pan, Critical Music)
 2022: Kotaro (with Jon Casey, Sable Valley Records)
 2022: A Taste of Hope (Remixes) (UKF Music)
 2022: It's Our Destiny (with Kučka, Deadbeats)
 2022: Somehow We Lost It All (with Pham & Josh Pan, Deadbeats)
 2022: Shift (with Noisia, Vision) 
 2022: Temper (with LIA, Deadbeats)
 2022: Pillow Talk (with Wingtip and What So Not, Deadbeats)
 2022: Empress (additional production by Quiet Bison, Deadbeats)
 2022: Unfold (Deadbeats)

References

External links 

 Imanu's website
 Imanu on Soundcloud

Dutch DJs
Dutch drum and bass musicians
21st-century Dutch musicians
Electronic dance music DJs
Mau5trap artists